The Cessna T-37 Tweet (designated Model 318 by Cessna) is a small, economical twin-engined jet trainer type which flew for decades as a primary trainer for the United States Air Force (USAF) and in the air forces of several other nations.  The T-37C was also capable of light attack.  The A-37 Dragonfly variant served in the light attack role during the Vietnam War and continues to serve in the air forces of several South American nations.

The T-37 served as the U.S. Air Force's primary pilot training vehicle for over 52 years after its first flight. After completing initial training in the Tweet, students moved on to other advanced Air Force, Navy, Marine Corps or Allied trainers. With a total of 1,269 Cessna T-37s built, the USAF retired its last T-37 in 2009. It was replaced in USAF service by the Beechcraft T-6 Texan II.

Development

Origins
The Cessna Aircraft Company of Wichita, Kansas, provided the United States Army during World War II and the Korean War with utility, light transport, and observation aircraft, particularly the "O-1 Bird Dog" series.

In the spring of 1952, the USAF issued a request for proposals for a "Trainer Experimental (TX)" program, specifying a lightweight, two-seat basic trainer for introducing USAF cadets to jet aircraft.

Cessna responded to the TX request with a twin-jet design with side-by-side seating. The USAF liked the Cessna design, which was given the company designation "Model 318", and the side-by-side seating since it let the student and instructor interact more closely than with tandem seating. In the spring of 1954, the USAF awarded Cessna a contract for three prototypes of the Model 318, and a contract for a single static test aircraft. The Air Force designated the type as XT-37.

The XT-37 had a low, straight wing, with the engines buried in the wing roots, a clamshell-type canopy hinged to open vertically to the rear, a control layout similar to that of contemporary operational USAF aircraft, ejection seats, and tricycle landing gear with a wide track of 14 ft (4.3 m). It first flew on 12 October 1954.

The wide track and a steerable nosewheel made the aircraft easy to handle on the ground, and the short landing gear avoided the need for access ladders and service stands. The aircraft was designed to be simple to maintain, with more than 100 access panels and doors. An experienced ground crew could change an engine in about half an hour.

The XT-37 was aerodynamically clean, so much so that a speedbrake was fitted behind the nosewheel doors to help increase drag for landing and for use in other phases of flight. Since the short landing gear placed the engine air intakes close to the ground, screens pivoted over the intakes from underneath when the landing gear was extended, to prevent foreign object damage.

The XT-37 was fitted with two Continental-Teledyne J69-T-9 turbojet engines, French Turbomeca Marboré engines built under license, with 920 lbf (4.1 kN) thrust each. The engines had thrust attenuators to allow them to remain spooled-up (i.e. rotating at speeds above idle) during landing approach, permitting shorter landings while still allowing the aircraft to easily make another go-around in case something went wrong.

The initial prototype crashed during spin tests. Later prototypes had new features to improve handling, including long strakes along the nose, and an extensively redesigned and enlarged tail. After these modifications, the USAF found the aircraft acceptable to their needs, and ordered it into production as the T-37A. Production aircraft remained tricky in recovering from a spin; the recovery procedure was complex compared with most aircraft.

Production
The production T-37A was similar to the XT-37 prototypes, except for minor changes to fix problems revealed by the flight-test program. The first T-37A was completed in September 1955 and flew later that year.

The T-37A was very noisy, even by the standards of jet aircraft. The intake of air into its small turbojets emitted a high-pitched shriek that led some to describe the trainer as the "Screaming Mimi", the "6,000 pound dog whistle" or "Converter" (converts fuel and air into noise and smoke). The piercing whistle quickly gave the T-37 its name: "Tweety Bird", or just "Tweet". The Air Force spent a lot of time and money soundproofing buildings at bases where the T-37 was stationed, and ear protection remains mandatory for all personnel when near an operating aircraft.

The Air Force ordered 444 T-37As, with the last produced in 1959. In 1957, the US Army evaluated three T-37As for battlefield observation and other combat support roles, but eventually procured the Grumman OV-1 Mohawk, instead.

The Air Force liked the T-37A, but considered it to be underpowered; consequently, they ordered an improved version, the T-37B, with uprated J-69-T-25 engines. The new engines provided about 10% more thrust and were more reliable. Improved avionics were also specified for the new variant.

A total of 552 newly built T-37Bs was constructed through 1973. All surviving T-37As were eventually upgraded to the T-37B standard, as well.

In 1962, Cessna suggested the T-37B as a replacement for the North American F-100 Super Sabre as the primary aircraft for the USAF aerobatic demonstration team, the Thunderbirds, but the USAF was satisfied with the F-100.

The T-37A and T-37B had no built-in armament and no stores pylons for external armament. In 1961, Cessna began developing a modest enhancement of the T-37 for use as a weapons trainer. The new variant, the T-37C, was intended for export and could be used for light attack duties if required.

The prototype T-37C was a modified T-37B. The primary changes included stronger wings, with a stores pylon under each wing outboard of the main landing gear well. The T-37C could also be fitted with wingtip fuel tanks, each with a capacity of 65 US gal (245 L), that could be dropped in an emergency.

A computing gunsight and gun camera were added. The T-37C could also be fitted with a reconnaissance camera mounted inside the fuselage.

The primary armament of the T-37C was the General Electric "multipurpose pod" with a .50 caliber (12.7 mm) machine gun with 200 rounds, two 70 mm (2.75 in) folding-fin rocket pods, and four practice bombs. Other stores, such as folding-fin rocket pods or Sidewinder air-to-air missiles, could be carried.

As the engines were not upgraded, this reduced top speed to 595 km/h (370 mph), though the wingtip tanks increased maximum range to 1,770 km (1,100 mi).

T-37 production ended in 1975. The list of exports above amounts to 273 T-37Cs. Adding this to the 444 T-37As and 552 T-37Bs gives a total of 1,269 aircraft built.

Concept aircraft

Cessna proposed a number of innovative variants of the Tweet that never went into production. In 1959, Cessna built a prototype of a light jet transport version of the T-37, designated the Cessna Model 407, which was stretched  to accommodate a four-place pressurized cockpit with an automobile-type configuration. Only a wooden mockup of the Model 407 was constructed. The project was cancelled due to insufficient customer interest.

The company also proposed a similar four-place military light transport, the Model 405, with a big, clamshell canopy, but it was never built.

In response to a United States Navy "Tandem Navy Trainer" (TNT) requirement, Cessna proposed a T-37 with a modified fuselage featuring a tandem cockpit. The Navy selected the North American T-2 Buckeye, instead.

Cessna proposed various other trainer derivatives for the US Navy and Air Force, including a vertical takeoff version based on the TNT configuration and incorporating lift-jet pods in the wings, but none of them reached the prototype stage.

Operational history

The T-37A was delivered to the U.S. Air Force beginning in June 1956. The USAF began cadet training in the T-37A during 1957. The first T-37B was delivered in 1959. Instructors and students considered the T-37A a pleasant aircraft to fly. It handled well and was agile and responsive, though it was definitely not overpowered. It was capable of all traditional aerobatic maneuvers. Students intentionally placed the aircraft into a spin as part of their pilot training.

The Air Force made several attempts to replace the T-37 (including the Fairchild T-46), but it remained in service with the USAF until it was phased out in favor of the Beechcraft T-6 Texan II between 2001 and 2009. The T-6 is a turboprop aircraft with more power, better fuel efficiency, and more modern avionics than the Tweet.

The final USAF student training sortie by a T-37B aircraft in the Air Education and Training Command took place on 17 June 2009. The last USAF operator of the T-37B, the 80th Flying Training Wing, flew the sortie from its home station at Sheppard AFB, Texas. The last T-37B was officially retired from active USAF service on 31 July 2009.

Variants
XT-37 Two-seat jet trainer prototype aircraft, powered by two Continental YJ69-T-9 turbojet engines; three built (54-716 - 54-718).

T-37A  Two-seat basic jet trainer aircraft, powered by two Continental J69-T-9 turbojet engines; 534 built.

T-37B  Two-seat basic jet trainer aircraft, powered by two Continental J69-T-25 turbojet engines, fitted with improved navigation and communications equipment.

T-37C Two-seat basic jet trainer, light-attack aircraft, fitted with two weapons pylons, one under each wing; 269 built.

XAT-37D Two-seat counter-insurgency, light-attack prototype aircraft; two built.

YT-48A Proposed development with two Garrett F109-GA-100 engines; none built.

Operators
 Ecuadorian Air Force – 10 T-37Bs.
 Pakistan Air Force – 63 aircraft, including 24 T-37Bs and 39 T-37Cs. In 2008 20 T-37s were delivered that were ordered from the U.S.  On 28 October 2015, the Turkish Air Force gave the Pakistan Air Force 34 T-37Cs, including spares in an agreement between Turkey and Pakistan.

Former operators

T-37s, including both new-build and ex-USAF aircraft, were supplied to a number of countries, including:
 Bangladesh Air Force received total of 12 T-37B aircraft from USA.  Deal for additional T-37s from Pakistan never transpired, all remaining Cessna T-37Bs Tweet in reserve at Jessor Air Base under squadron 15. Retired from active service.
 Brazilian Air Force – 65 T-37Cs, later passing 30 on to South Korea and 12 on to Paraguay, which were never delivered due to US veto.
 Burmese Air Force – 12 T-37Cs.
 Chilean Air Force – 32 aircraft, including 20 T-37Bs and 12 T-37Cs. Both variants were phased out in 1998.
 Colombian Air Force – 14 aircraft, including 4 T-37Bs and 10 T-37Cs. The last two aircraft were retired on July 10, 2021.
 German Air Force – 47 T-37Bs now retired, superseded by the T-6 Texan II
 Hellenic Air Force – 32 aircraft, including 8 T-37Bs and 24 T-37Cs.
 Royal Jordanian Air Force – 15 aircraft, apparently ex-USAF T-37Bs.
 Khmer Air Force – 24 T-37Bs.
 Portuguese Air Force – 30 T-37Cs, received from 1963, grounded in 1991 and phased out in 1992. Superseded by the Alpha Jet. From 1977 to 1991, some of the T-37Cs were used by the aerobatic demonstration team Asas de Portugal (Wings of Portugal).
 Peruvian Air Force – 32 T-37Bs.

 ROK Air Force – originally 25 T-37Cs, plus 30 later bought from Brazil.  First introduced: June 1973.
 Republic of Vietnam Air Force – 24 T-37Bs.
 Royal Thai Air Force – 16 aircraft, including 10 T-37Bs and 6 T-37Cs.
 Turkish Air Force – 65 T-37Cs.
 United States Air Force
 Vietnam People's Air Force – captured ex-South Vietnamese T-37Bs
 Royal Moroccan Air Force – 14 aircraft, received in 1995. Retired from active service.

Survivors

Specifications (T-37B)

See also

References

Citations

Sources

External links

 Official website Cessna history

T-37
Cessna T-37
Twinjets
Low-wing aircraft
Cruciform tail aircraft
Aircraft first flown in 1954